Lake Kaunewinne is a reservoir in the U.S. state of Wisconsin.

"Kau-ne-win-ne" is a name derived from the Chippewa language meaning "Yellow River".

References

Lakes of Wood County, Wisconsin
Lakes of Wisconsin